2800 Polar Way is a cold storage facility located in Richland, Washington, United States, where it dominates the northern landscape. It is both the largest refrigerated warehouse and the largest automated freezer on Earth.
 Holliday Fenoglio Fowler (HFF) financed the build-to-suit refrigerated warehouse for tenant Preferred Freezer Services. The project broke ground on May 12, 2014, and opened in late July 2015.

In 2016, HHF sold the property to Lexington Realty Trust,  an S&P 600 REIT company. In 2019, Lineage Logistics acquired Preferred Freezer, and continues to operate the facility.

Capacity

In 2019, the company purchased an additional  lot to expand facilities by one third.

References

External links
 Lineage Logistics website

Richland, Washington
Food preservation
Cool warehouses
Warehouses in the United States